A sufuria (Swahili sufuria; English plural sufurias) is a Swahili language word, adopted in the local African Great Lakes regional variety of English, for a flat-based, deep-sided, lipped and handleless cooking pot or container. It is ubiquitous in Kenya, Tanzania and other Great Lakes nations. A replacement for more traditional crockery containers (ek fara), it's used in many Kenyan households for cooking, serving and storing food. Most sufuria are today made of aluminum, and produced and purchased locally in the informal sector. Sufuria were traditionally used to cook over open fire, a charcoal brazier (a jiko), or coals, and are purchased in a variety of sizes, with and without lids.

See also
 List of cooking vessels

References

Burundian culture
Cooking vessels
Kenyan culture
Tanzanian culture